Roger Rossinelli (10 August 1927 – 18 April 2005) was a French racing cyclist. He rode in the 1952 Tour de France.

References

1927 births
2005 deaths
French male cyclists
Place of birth missing